The Justin Zimmer House is a residence in Warsaw, Indiana at 2513 East Center Street. The home was designed by Alvin M. Strauss and built in 1934. It was home to the founder of Zimmer Holdings Justin O. Zimmer (1884-1951) and is one of two Tudor Revival architecture houses in the city. It is now the White Hill Manor bed and breakfast.

It was added to the National Register of Historic Places on December 19, 1991.

See also
National Register of Historic Places listings in Kosciusko County, Indiana

References

Houses on the National Register of Historic Places in Indiana
Houses completed in 1934
Tudor Revival architecture in Indiana
Buildings and structures in Kosciusko County, Indiana
National Register of Historic Places in Kosciusko County, Indiana
1934 establishments in Indiana